Madly in Love is a 1981 Italian romantic comedy film written and directed by Castellano & Pipolo, starring Adriano Celentano and Ornella Muti.

Plot
Cristina, the princess of a fictional monarchical state named Saint Tulipe, is visiting Rome with her father, Gustavo VI, who is trying to appeal to Italy's national bank for a loan to buoy his country's financial crisis. Bored and rebellious, Cristina sneaks away from the embassy and decides to engage in a sightseeing tour of the city. On the bus she takes, Cristina meets driver Barnaba Cecchini, who instantly falls in love with her.

Barnaba, a charming and happy-to-go ATAC employee, takes Cristina around the city, including the Roman Forum, and slowly begins to win her personal interest. However, after having had her fun and spending a (chaste) night in his apartment, she locks him into his clothes dresser's massive drawer and leaves with her family's bodyguards without telling him about her true identity. After a fruitless search on his own, Barnaba recognizes her when he witnesses a TV report about her sojourn in Rome, and despite his modest background, he boldly asks her father for her hand. When Gustavo refuses, Barnaba engages in a series of daredevil schemes to prove his worth, even to the point of appearing (by Cristina's invitation) at a royal banquet in his ATAC uniform and holding successful discussions about high politics with a number of international dignitaries.

However, although Barnaba succeeds in impressing Gustavo and winning Cristina's genuine affection, Saint Tulipe's financial crisis finally drives the king into engaging his daughter to an arms manufacturer. Determined not to lose the love of his life, Barnaba appeals to the citizens of Rome to make a donation for the cause. As Gustavo's family leaves the city, Barnaba's sympathizers shower them with money, thus annulling both the royal debts and Cristina's planned engagement to a stranger, and Barnaba gaining Gustavo's approval to marry his daughter.

Cast

Production
The film was shot in Como, with scenes filmed in Villa Olmo and in Rome.

Reception
The film was a commercial success.

References

External links
 

1981 films
1981 romantic comedy films
Films directed by Castellano & Pipolo
Films scored by Bruno Zambrini
Films set in Rome
Films shot in Rome
Italian romantic comedy films
United Artists films
1980s Italian-language films
1980s Italian films